The Colour of my Dreams is the debut album by former Razorlight and We Are Scientists drummer Andy Burrows. The album was in aid of charity with all proceeds donated to a hospice for children in Winchester, Burrows' home town. The songs on the record are from a book of poetry Burrows found written by a close family friend. The album was recorded in Burrows' home.  The album artwork comes from local artist and teacher, David Thomas.

Overview 

The album received much praise from the other members of the Razorlight band. Bassist Carl Dalemo said that it had been in itself huge progress for the profile of Razorlight.

To support the release of The Colour of my Dreams, Burrows organised a one-off charity concert at Islington's union chapel where the band had performed for MENCAP in November 2007. As well as Burrows performing songs from the album, many other musicians and celebrities offered their support, notably members of Editors, The Guillemots, celebrity chef Jamie Oliver and up and coming artist Lucy Rose.

Track listing 
"Boxes"
"Big Chief Grandad"
"The Colour Of My Dreams"
"Missionary Sales"
"Teacher Goodbye"
"Peace"
"Moon"
"Drummer Boy"
"Winter"
"Cuddle"
"Lighthouse Men"

References 

Andy Burrows albums
2008 albums